There are at least two islands called Edwards Islet:
Edwards Islet (Tasmania), in Australia
Edwards Islet (Ducie Islands), in the Pitcairn Islands